George Szekeres AM FAA (29 May 1911 – 28 August 2005) was a Hungarian–Australian mathematician.

Early years
Szekeres was born in Budapest, Hungary, as Szekeres György and received his degree in chemistry at the Technical University of Budapest. He worked six years in Budapest as an analytical chemist. He married Esther Klein in 1937. Being Jewish, the family had to escape from the Nazi persecution so Szekeres took a job in Shanghai, China. There they lived through World War II, the Japanese occupation and the beginnings of the Communist revolution. Their son, Peter, was born in Shanghai.

Career
In 1948, he was offered a position at the University of Adelaide, Australia, that he gladly accepted. After all the troubles he had, he began flourishing as a mathematician. A few years later, his daughter Judy was born. In 1963, the family moved to Sydney, where Szekeres took a position at the University of New South Wales, and taught there until his retirement in 1975. He also devised problems for secondary school mathematical olympiads run by the university where he taught, and for a yearly undergraduate competition run by the Sydney University Mathematics Society.

Szekeres worked closely with many prominent mathematicians throughout his life, including Paul Erdős, Esther Szekeres (née Esther Klein), Pál Turán, Béla Bollobás, Ronald Graham, Alf van der Poorten, Miklós Laczkovich, and John Coates.

Honours
 In 1968 he was the winner of the Thomas Ranken Lyle Medal of the Australian Academy of Science.
 In May 2001, a festschrift was held in honour of his ninetieth birthday at the University of New South Wales.
 In January 2001 he was awarded the Australian Centenary Medal "for service to Australian society and science in pure mathematics".
 In 2001, the Australian Mathematical Society created the George Szekeres Medal in his honour.
 In June 2002, he was made a Member of the Order of Australia (AM) 'for service to mathematics and science, particularly as a contributor to education and research, to the support and development of the University of New South Wales Mathematics Competition and the Australian Mathematical Olympiad Team.'

Personal life
The so-called Happy Ending problem is an example of how mathematics pervaded George's life. During 1933, George and several other students met frequently in Budapest to discuss mathematics. At one of these meetings, Esther Klein proposed the following problem:
Given five points in the plane in general position, prove that four of them form a convex quadrilateral.
After allowing George, Paul Erdős, and the other students to scratch their heads for some time, Esther explained her proof.  Subsequently, George and Paul wrote a paper (1935) that generalises this result; it is regarded as one of the foundational works in the field of combinatorial geometry. Erdős dubbed the original problem the "Happy Ending" problem because it resulted in George and Esther's marriage in 1937.

George and Esther died within an hour of each other on 28 August 2005 in Adelaide, South Australia.

See also

 Powerful number
 Szekeres snark
 Generalized continued fraction
 Kruskal–Szekeres coordinates
 Szekeres–Wilf number
 Schröder's equation
 Erdős–Szekeres theorem

Notes

References
 Giles, J. R., Wallis, J. S., "George Szekeres. With affection and respect", Journal of the Australian Mathematical Society, Series A, Vol 21 (1976), No 4, pp. 385–392.
 Cowling, M., "Obituary George and Esther Szekeres",  Gazette of the Australian Mathematical Society, Vol 32 (2005), No 4, pp. 221–224.

External links
MacTutor Biography
The work of George Szekeres on functional equations Keith Briggs

1911 births
2005 deaths
Australian Jews
Australian chemists
Australian mathematicians
Budapest University of Technology and Economics alumni
Combinatorialists
Fellows of the Australian Academy of Science
Hungarian Jews
20th-century Hungarian mathematicians
21st-century Hungarian mathematicians
Members of the Order of Australia
Academic staff of the University of New South Wales
Hungarian chemists
Austro-Hungarian mathematicians
Hungarian emigrants to Australia